Corail-Henri is a communal section in the Saint Louis du Sud commune of the Aquin Arrondissement, in the Sud department of Haiti.

References

Communal sections of Haiti
Populated places in Sud (department)